Sweco (originally "Swedish Consultants") is a European engineering consultancy company, active in the fields of consulting engineering, environmental technology and architecture.  Sweco is Europe’s leading architecture and engineering consultancy company, established in 14 countries (Sweden, Norway, Finland, Denmark, Estonia, Lithuania, Bulgaria, Czech Republic, Germany, Belgium, Netherlands, UK, Ireland and Poland). Sweco carries out projects in 70 countries annually throughout the world.Sweco plans and designs buildings and community infrastructure. The company assists with analysis, calculations, studies and the planning, design and construction of what is to be built. 
The company is listed on NASDAQ OMX Stockholm since 1998, and has since acquired more than a hundred companies of varying sizes. Åsa Bergman is president and CEO since 2018.

History 
Sweco was formed 1997, when FFNS (Falck/Fogelvik/Nordström/Smas AB), founded itself in 1958, acquired VBB group (Vattenbyggnadsbyrån AB). The name Sweco is an abbreviation of "Swedish Consultants", a name used by VBB in international projects. VBB has had its first international project in St. Petersburg in 1902; since then, the companies today in Sweco's portfolio carried out projects in more than 100 countries. Sweco expanded as a company thanks to over 130 mergers between 1998 and 2020. The oldest of these engineering offices was Theorells Installationskonsult AB, founded in 1889 by Swedish MSE Hugo Theorell, and turned into Sweco Systems AB after it was acquired. For this reason, Sweco claims over 130 years of experience in engineering projects. In 2018, BML Ingenieurgesellschaft mbH and Götzelmann + Partner GmbH оoined Sweco.  The two companies strengthen the areas of technical building equipment as well as wastewater. In the same year, the company launched an international campaign called Urban Insight, which looks at current challenges in urban development.

Sweco has grown profitably both organically and through acquisition. Sweco has extensive experience in acquisitions and has been a force for consolidation in Sweden, the Nordic region and in northern Europe. Sweco has since 1998 acquired over 100 companies, and has its historical roots in a number of companies, among them:

 BECO
 BLOCO
 Theorells Installationskonsult AB
 VBB
 Vectura Consulting AB
 VIAK
 Grontmij
 Årstiderne Arkitekter
 MLM Group
 KANT Architects
In 2019, the group employed 16,000 people, including 5,600 in Sweden. With just over 30%, the company's largest shareholder is Investment AB Latour, which belongs to Swede Gustaf Douglas.

Notable projects 

 Abu Simbel temples – the relocation of the temples in the 1960s
 Bloomberg European Headquarters, London
 City Tunnel (Malmö)
 European Spallation Source (ESS), Lund
 Facebook data center, Luleå
 Kuwait Towers
 Kuwait Water Towers
 Stockholm City Line
 Tegera Arena
 The Northern Link (Norra länken)
 The Ray Farringdon, London
 Øresund Bridge, Malmö & Köpenhamn
 Bybanen
 Oosterweel Link

References

External links
Official website
Financial reports
Sweco history

Companies based in Stockholm
International engineering consulting firms
Companies listed on Nasdaq Stockholm
Swedish companies established in 1997
Engineering consulting firms of Sweden
Abu Simbel